Icelandic national costume, collectively known in Icelandic as Þjóðbúningurinn has enjoyed various levels of popularity since the term was coined in Iceland in the 19th century, during the struggle for independence. Since 2001 the national costume is regulated by Þjóðbúningaráð (The National Costume Authority), which preserves the correct techniques of making them and instructs people.

Women's costume
The five following types of costume are all recognized as Icelandic National costumes. However both the kyrtill and skautbúningur were designed in the 19th century from scratch as ceremonial costumes, while the faldbúningur, peysuföt and the upphlutur are traditional daily wear of Icelandic women in olden times.

Faldbúningur

The Faldbúningur is an older type of costume worn by women since at least the 17th century and well into the 19th. In its most recognized form it incorporated a hat decorated with a curved sheet-like ornament protruding into the air and exists in two variants. One of which is the krókfaldur and the other is the spaðafaldur. Previously a large hat decorated with gold-wire bands was worn with it, as well as ruff which is the reason for the faldbúningur'''s wide collar, which was designed to support it. Later, around the start of the 18th century women started to wear the much simpler tail-cap with it.

Peysuföt

The Peysuföt are black woollen clothes commonly worn by women in the 18-19th century. They usually consisted of a twill skirt and a jacket of fine knitted woollen yarn with a black tail cap. It is believed that this costume was invented when women, desiring simpler working clothes than the faldbúningur, started to use male articles of clothing. This includes both the tail-cap and the peysa which originally was a jacket with a single row of buttons, but evolved into this costume and eventually discarded with the buttons.

Upphlutur
The Upphlutur is a woman's costume, consisting of bodice that can be coloured in bright colours such as red or blue, but often black. Its headpiece is a tail cap. The costume is basically the undergarment of the faldbúningur which evolved into a costume of its own right.

Kyrtill
The Kyrtill is a costume for women, designed by the artist Sigurður Guðmundsson in the 19th century. It was designed to look like Viking Age costumes. It however incorporates a hat similar to the one on the skautbúningur. While Sigurður's vision of the Viking Age costume remains popular, costumes designed to more closely resemble archaeological finds have gained some popularity as well.

Skautbúningur
The Skautbúningur was also designed by Sigurður Guðmundsson. It was conceived as a modernized variation of the faldbúningur, which had fallen out of use by the middle of the 19th century. It incorporates a complicated hat inspired by the ones traditionally used with the faldbúningur.

Men's costumeBúningur karla or the Men's costume exists in three or four radically different versions. The þjóðbúningur karla is the only direct descendant of traditional daily wear of Icelandic men, while the other were designed from the start as ceremonial costume.

Þjóðbúningur
The one considered most traditional consists of woolen breeches or trousers, a usually double buttoned vest and a double buttoned jacket called treyja. Sometimes a peysa with a single row of buttons is used in lieu of the vest and treyja.  On the head is a tail cap, though historically different hats were also used. This costume was usually black, navy blue or dark green, although the vest, which was usually brighter was sometimes red, some regions stood out, using white wool instead of the darker colors. It is identical to the clothing Icelandic men commonly wore from the 17th until the 19th century.

Fornmannaklæði

In the middle of the 19th century, when many Icelandic men had taken to using continental clothing, Sigurður Guðmundsson, an Icelandic artist, designed a costume for men which closely resembles 10th century Nordic clothing. While it attained some popularity at the time, it eventually disappeared until at the end of the 20th century when Viking culture and traditions have enjoyed increased popularity.

Hátíðarbúningur

Although not a traditional costume, the hátíðarbúningur was conceived as a modernized version of the men's traditional national costume and is frequently worn instead of a tuxedo to formal events. It is the result of a competition for an updated (i.e., more pragmatic) version of the men's national costume held in 1994 in correlation with the 50th anniversary of Iceland's independence from Denmark and the establishment of the republic. Some have critiqued the design of the hátíðarbúningur, claiming that it bears greater resemblance to the Faroese national costume in its styling. Regardless, the hátíðarbúningur continues to enjoy widespread popularity among Icelanders.

The fourth costume

Sigurður Guðmundsson also designed another costume in the middle of the 19th century, which was commonly worn by students. It consisted of a black jacket, white shirt and black knee-breeches with horizontally striped or solid colored white socks.

Children's costumes
The búningur barna or the children's costumes did not differ from the adult's version (except in size) until the 20th century, when girls were given shorter skirts.

Shoes
Although today, modern shoes are often used with the National Costumes, traditionally shoes made of either fish or sheep-skin, with woollen inlets, were worn with the costumes. These shoes are known as roðskór and sauðskinsskór respectively. Some people also use 18th or 19th century type leather shoes with buckles similar to the footwear commonly used with the Faroese and Norwegian National Costumes.

Usage
In olden times these clothes, except the skautbúningur, kyrtill and hátíðarbúningur'', were worn daily by people of all ages and classes. Today they are worn by many on ceremonial occasions such as the National day, Birthdays and Weddings.

See also
Lopapeysa
Bunad

Notes

External links
Buningurinn.is - Official Website of Þjóðbúningaráð, The National Costume Authority
Upphlutur.is - Website of the Þjóðbúningastofan, National Costume house 
BB.is - 3 Pictures of Icelandic National Costumes 
National Museum of Iceland

National Costume
Folk costumes